Hullsia is a genus of flowering plants in the family Asteraceae. It only contains one species, Hullsia argillicola.

It is native to Australia, mainly the states of Northern Territory and Western Australia, and it grows on heavy clay soils. Located in regions that flood frequently, such as plains, paddocks and swamps.

Description
It has yellow flowers.

Taxonomy
The genus name of Hullsia is in honour of Charles Stephen Hulls (c. 1835–1923), accompanied John McKinlay  explorer and cattle grazier, on expeditions in Australia. The Latin specific epithet of argillicola means dwelling on clay, or 'argillicolous'. Due to the fact it was found in the clay soils of northern Australia.

Both genus and species were first described and published by Philip Sydney Short in Muelleria Vol.20 on page 58 in 2004.

The genus was once thought to be part of the Brachyscome genus.

Hullsia argillicola was verified by United States Department of Agriculture and the Agricultural Research Service on 20 November 2019.

References

Other sources
 Barrie, F. R. 2011. Report of the General Committee: 11. Taxon 60:1212. Note: Committee recommends that it should not be treated as a homonym of Hulsea Torr. & A. Gray
 Brummitt, R. K. 2009. Report of the Nomenclature Committee for Vascular Plants: 60. Taxon 58:289-290. Note: Committee recommends that it should not be treated as a homonym of Hulsea Torr. & A. Gray

Monotypic Asteraceae genera
Plants described in 2004
Flora of Australia
Astereae